Aleksandr Sergeyevich Sobolev (born 7 March 1997) is a Russian professional footballer who plays as a striker for Spartak Moscow and the Russia national team.

Club career

Sobolev made his Russian Premier League debut for FC Tom Tomsk on 5 December 2016 in a game against FC Ufa.

Sobolev scored more goals than any other player in the 2017–18 Russian Cup.

On 2 February 2019, Sobolev joined Yenisey Krasnoyarsk on loan.

On 29 January 2020, Sobolev joined Spartak Moscow on loan until the end of the 2019–20 season, with Spartak holding an option to purchase his rights at the end of the loan.

On 18 May 2020, Spartak Moscow announced that they had exercised the option to purchase Sobolev from Krylia Sovetov.

On 13 August 2021, he extended his contract with Spartak until May 2026. On 29 May 2022, Sobolev scored the opening goal in the 2022 Russian Cup Final against FC Dynamo Moscow which Spartak won 2–1.

International career
On 6 October 2019, Sobolev was called up to the Russia national team for the first time for the UEFA Euro 2020 qualifying matches against Scotland and Cyprus, replacing injured Fedor Smolov.

He made his debut on 8 October 2020 in a friendly against Sweden and scored an added-time goal in a 2–1 home loss.

On 11 May 2021, he was included in the preliminary extended 30-man squad for UEFA Euro 2020. On 2 June 2021, he was included in the final squad. He appeared as a late substitute in Russia's second game against Finland on 16 June in a 1–0 victory. He appeared as a substitute for the last half-hour of the match on 21 June in the last group game against Denmark as Russia lost 4–1 and was eliminated.

Career statistics

Club

International

International goals
Scores and results list Russia's goal tally first, score column indicates score after each Sobolev goal.

Honours
Spartak Moscow
Russian Cup: 2021–22

Individual
 Russian Premier League Player of the Month: July 2019, March 2021, August 2022.

References

External links

Living people
1997 births
Sportspeople from Barnaul
Russian footballers
Association football forwards
Russia international footballers
Russia under-21 international footballers
UEFA Euro 2020 players
Russian Premier League players
Russian First League players
FC Dynamo Barnaul players
FC Tom Tomsk players
PFC Krylia Sovetov Samara players
FC Yenisey Krasnoyarsk players
FC Spartak Moscow players